Vosburg Turning Mill is a historic turning mill complex located near Woodstock, Ulster County, New York.  The complex includes the large two-story, "L"-shaped timber frame mill (1899) and two associate dwellings.

It was added to the National Register of Historic Places in 2000.

References

National Register of Historic Places in Ulster County, New York
Woodstock, New York
Industrial buildings completed in 1899
1899 establishments in New York (state)
Historic districts on the National Register of Historic Places in New York (state)
Industrial buildings and structures on the National Register of Historic Places in New York (state)
Turning